Petronella (German: Petronella - Das Geheimnis der Berge) is a 1927 German-Swiss silent historical film directed by Hanns Schwarz and starring Maly Delschaft, William Dieterle and Oskar Homolka.

The film's sets were designed by the art director Uwe Jens Krafft. It was shot at the Babelsberg Studios in Berlin.

Cast 
 Maly Delschaft as Pia Schwiek
 William Dieterle as Josmarie Seiler
 Oskar Homolka as Fridolin Bortis
 Theodor Loos as Pfarrer Imboden
 Frida Richard as Das Tschäderli
 Ernst Rückert as Gabarel Schwick
 Rudolf Lettinger as Pias Vater
 Georg John as Der alte Amros
 Fritz Kampers as Des Pfarrers Bruder
 Hedwig Wangel as Des Pfarrers Wirtschafterin
 Uwe Jens Krafft as Präsident Zumesch

References

Bibliography
 Goble, Alan. The Complete Index to Literary Sources in Film. Walter de Gruyter, 1999.

External links 

Films of the Weimar Republic
Swiss silent films
German silent feature films
Films directed by Hanns Schwarz
German black-and-white films
Swiss black-and-white films
1927 films
1920s historical films
German historical films
Swiss historical films
Films set in the 1800s
Films shot at Babelsberg Studios
1920s German films